Samica Kierska is a river of Poland, a tributary of the Warta at Kiszewo.

Rivers of Poland
Rivers of Greater Poland Voivodeship